Clean Hands is a 2015 Dutch crime film directed by Tjebbo Penning.

Cast 
 Jeroen van Koningsbrugge - Eddie Kronenburg
 Thekla Reuten - Sylvia Kronenburg
 Bente Fokkens - Daphne Kronenburg
 Nino den Brave - Yuri Kronenburg
  - Charlie Kronenburg
 Angela Schijf - Chantal
 Cees Geel - Brandsma
  - Tromp
  - Frans

References

External links 

2015 crime films
Dutch crime films
2010s Dutch-language films